Between 1740 and 1778, four ships named York, for York, served the British East India Company (EIC) as Indiamen:

 made four voyages for the EIC before she was broken up in 1751.
 made two voyages for the EIC before she stranded and broke up in 1758.
 made four voyages for the EIC. She was sold in 1772 and was last listed in 1779. 
 made five voyages for the EIC. She was sold in 1788 and served as a transport until 1794.

In addition:
 made one voyage for the EIC between 1819 and 1820.
 was renamed York after she was sold and was still sailing under that name until 1782.

Ship names
Ships of the British East India Company